Windows Magazine was a monthly magazine for users of the Microsoft Windows operating system. The magazine was based in Manhasset, NY.

History and profile
Windows Magazine was founded in 1990.  It was sold to CMP Media in 1991. By 1999, it has a paid circulation of 800,000 and a staff of 45, but its last hardcopy issue was published in August 2002.

References

1990 establishments in the United States
2002 disestablishments in the United States
Defunct computer magazines published in the United States
Magazines established in 1990
Magazines disestablished in 2002
Monthly magazines published in the United States
Microsoft Windows magazines
Magazines published in New York (state)